Karambar Pass (el. 14,250 ft.) is a high mountain pass in Pakistan.  It connects the Yarkhun River valley in Pakistan's upper Chitral District to the Karambar river valley in Ishkoman tehsil of Ghizer district in Hunza Valley.  Sometimes it is misspelled as Karomber or Kromber pass.

The pass is one mile to the west of Karambar lake and two miles to the south of Dupsuk peak (5748m), which is the meeting point of Pakistan, Afghanistan and Pakistan Kashmir. Approximately 15 miles to the west of the pass lies the prominent Broghol pass. The Karambar River flows out of the Karambar lake in an initially southeast direction. South of Imit it is known as the Ishkoman river and joins the Ghizar river at Gahkuch to become the Gilgit river.

Mountain passes of Gilgit-Baltistan
Mountain passes of Khyber Pakhtunkhwa
Mountain passes of the Hindu Kush